Thomas Davey may refer to:

 Thomas Davey (governor) (1758–1823), second Lieutenant Governor of Van Diemens Land
 Thomas Davey (New Zealand politician) (1856–1934), MP for Christchurch and Christchurch East
 Thomas Davey (mayor) (1844–1928), Lord Mayor of Melbourne
 Tom Davey (baseball) (born 1973), American baseball player
 Tom Davey (footballer, born 1876) (1876–1907), Australian rules footballer with Melbourne
 Tom Davey (footballer, born 1916) (1916–1978), Australian rules footballer with Hawthorn

See also
Thomas Davy (disambiguation)